The Zemen Monastery (Zemenski manastir) is a Bulgarian Orthodox monastery located one kilometre away from the town of Zemen, Pernik Province in western Bulgaria.

The monastery was established in the 11th century. It comprises a church, belfry and two residential buildings. It is currently uninhabited. The church is a monument of culture.

The church dates from the foundation of the monastery in the late 11th century and has a cube shape, 9 metres long, 8 metres wide, 11.20 metres high. The material used was travertine. The altar is a stone monolith and the floor is made of colourful tiles. The church is richly painted inside, with two layers of frescoes, the scarcely preserved early one dating to the 11th century. The better preserved Biblical scenes date from the mid-14th century and include several portraits of donors: the first one depicting an unnamed man, his wife Doya and their two children, the second featuring a young man, Vitomir, and a boy, Stoyu. These portraits rank among the oldest and artistically most valuable in the Balkans after the frescoes of the Boyana Church.

Gallery

References

External links

 Zemen Monastery at BulgarianMonastery.com

Christian monasteries established in the 11th century
Christian monasteries in Bulgaria
Bulgarian Orthodox monasteries
Buildings and structures in Pernik Province
Medieval Bulgarian Orthodox church buildings
Mraka